Jessica Betts (born June 19, 1982) is an American singer based in Los Angeles. She has been married to Niecy Nash since 2020.

Career 
In 2005, Betts won The Road to Stardom with Missy Elliott, a singing competition television series. In 2011, she was chosen as a BET Music Matters artist, an initiative that "highlights the next BET superstars". Her song, "Get Up" appeared on the soundtrack for the film, Big Momma's House. During that same year, she released her debut album “You Can’t Resist”. In 2008, she followed this with the release of her second album "Jessie Pearl". 

Betts served as the opener for K. Michelle during her Rebellious Soul tour in 2013.

Betts premiered the music video for her song, "Catch Me" on Good Morning America in October 2020. The video stars her wife, actress Niecy Nash, in a wedding dress. Betts performed the song at the 2021 GLAAD Media Awards.

Betts appeared in a 2018 episode of the TV show, Claws, in the role of Nadege. In 2022, she appeared on the show, P-Valley.

Betts appeared in the December 2022 TV movie Reno 911! It's a Wonderful Heist.

Betts also appears as Nash’s love interest on The Rookie Feds.

Personal life 
In 2015, Betts became friends with actress Niecy Nash. They began dating in January 2020, and married on August 29 of that year.

Discography

Albums

Singles

References 

American lesbian musicians
African-American women singer-songwriters
Living people
LGBT African Americans
Musicians from Chicago
1982 births
20th-century American LGBT people
21st-century American LGBT people
21st-century African-American people
20th-century African-American people
20th-century African-American women
21st-century African-American women
Singer-songwriters from Illinois

External links